The Senate Committee on Rules and Administration, also called the Senate Rules and Administration Committee, is responsible for the rules of the United States Senate, administration of congressional buildings, and with credentials and qualifications of members of the Senate, including responsibility for contested elections. The committee is not as powerful as its House counterpart, the House Committee on Rules, as it does not set the terms of debate for individual legislative proposals, since the Senate has a tradition of open debate. Some members of the committee are also ex officio members of the Joint Committee on the Library and the Joint Committee on Printing.

History

The Committee was first created as the Select Committee to Revise the Rules of the Senate on December 3, 1867.  On December 9, 1874, it became a standing committee.

On January 2, 1947, its name was changed to the Committee on Rules and Administration, and it took over the functions of the following committees:
 Committee to Audit and Control the Contingent Expenses of the Senate
 Committee on Education and Labor (functions were later transferred to Health, Education, Labor, and Pensions Committee)
 Committee on Enrolled Bills
 Committee on Privileges and Elections

Jurisdiction
In accordance of Rule XXV of the United States Senate, all proposed legislation, messages, petitions, memorials, and other matters relating primarily to the following subjects is referred to the Senate Rules Committee:
 Administration of the Senate Office Buildings and the Senate wing of the Capitol, including the assignment of office space;
 Congressional organization relative to rules and procedures, and Senate rules and regulations, including floor and gallery rules;
 Corrupt practices;
 Credentials and qualifications of Members of the Senate, contested elections, and acceptance of incompatible offices;
 Federal elections generally, including the election of the President, Vice President, and Members of the Congress;
 Nominations to fill a vacancy in the Vice Presidency;
 Government Printing Office, and the printing and correction of the Congressional Record, as well as those matters provided for under rule XI;
 Meetings of the Congress and attendance of Members;
 Payment of money out of the contingent fund of the Senate or creating a charge upon the same (except that any resolution relating to substantive matter within the jurisdiction of any other standing committee of the Senate shall be first referred to such committee);
 Presidential succession;
 Purchase of books and manuscripts and erection of monuments to the memory of individuals;
 Senate Library and statuary, art, and pictures in the Capitol and Senate Office Buildings;
 Services to the Senate, including the Senate restaurant; and,
 United States Capitol and congressional office buildings, the Library of Congress, the Smithsonian Institution (and the incorporation of similar institutions), and the Botanic Gardens.

The Senate Rules Committee is also charged:
 To make a continuing study of the organization and operation of the Congress of the United States and shall recommend improvements in such organization and operation with a view toward strengthening the Congress, simplifying its operations, improving its relationships with other branches of the United States Government, and enabling it better to meet its responsibilities under the Constitution of the United States;
 To identify any court proceeding or action which, in the opinion of the Committee, is of vital interest to the Congress as a constitutionally established institution of the Federal Government and call such proceeding or action to the attention of the Senate; and,
 To develop, implement, and update as necessary a strategic planning process and a strategic plan for the functional and technical infrastructure support of the Senate and provide oversight over plans developed by Senate officers and others in accordance with the strategic planning process.

Members, 118th Congress

Members, 117th Congress

Chairs

Select Committee to Revise the Rules of the Senate, 1867–1874
 1867–1871: Henry B. Anthony (R-RI)
 1871–1873: Samuel Pomeroy (R-KS)
 1873–1874: Thomas Ferry (R-MI)

Committee on Rules, 1874–1947
Thomas Ferry (R-MI) 1874–1877
James G. Blaine (R-ME) 1877–1879
John T. Morgan (D-AL) 1879–1881
William P. Frye (R-ME) 1881–1887
Nelson W. Aldrich (R-RI) 1887–1893
Joseph C. S. Blackburn (D-KY) 1893–1895
Nelson W. Aldrich (R-RI) 1895–1899
John C. Spooner (R-WI) 1899–1907
Philander C. Knox (R-PA) 1907–1909
W. Murray Crane (R-MA) 1909–1913
Lee S. Overman (D-NC) 1913–1919
Philander C. Knox (R-PA) 1919–1921
Charles Curtis (R-KS) 1921–1929
George H. Moses (R-NH) 1929–1933
Royal S. Copeland (D-NY) 1933–1936
Matthew M. Neely (D-WV) 1936–1941
Harry F. Byrd (D-VA) 1941–1947

Committee on Rules and Administration, 1947–present
C. Wayland Brooks (R-IL) 1947–1949
Carl Hayden (D-AZ) 1949–1953
William E. Jenner (R-IN) 1953–1955
Theodore F. Green (D-RI) 1955–1957
Thomas C. Hennings, Jr. (D-MO) 1957–1960
Mike Mansfield (D-MT) 1960–1963
B. Everett Jordan (D-NC) 1963–1973
Howard W. Cannon (D-NV) 1973–1978
Claiborne Pell (D-RI) 1978–1981
Charles McC. Mathias, Jr. (R-MD) 1981–1987
Wendell H. Ford (D-KY) 1987–1995
Ted Stevens (R-AK) 1995
John W. Warner (R-VA) 1995–1999
Mitch McConnell (R-KY) 1999–2001
Christopher Dodd (D-CT) 2001
Mitch McConnell (R-KY) 2001
Christopher Dodd (D-CT) 2001–2003
Trent Lott (R-MS) 2003–2007
Dianne Feinstein (D-CA), 2007–2009
Chuck Schumer (D-NY), 2009–2015 
Roy Blunt (R-MO), 2015–2017 
Richard Shelby (R-AL), 2017–2018
Roy Blunt (R-MO), 2018–2021
Amy Klobuchar (D-MN), 2021–present

Historical committee rosters

116th Congress

115th Congress

Source:

114th Congress

Source:  to 297

Notes

References

External links
 Official site (Archive)
 Senate Rules and Administration Committee. Legislation activity and reports, Congress.gov.

Rules and Administration
1867 establishments in Washington, D.C.